Dáithí Sproule (born 23 May 1950) is a guitarist and singer of traditional Irish music. He is the grandson of Frank Carney and uncle of singer Claire Sproule.

Biography
Born and raised in Derry, Northern Ireland, at the age of 18 he moved to Dublin in Ireland, where he attended university. Growing up, he listened to Bob Dylan, Bert Jansch, the Beatles, British folk songs and traditional Irish music. It was in Dublin that he entered the music scene which was prominent in Ireland at the time. As a teenager he had met the Ó Domhnaill family during trips to the Gaeltacht area of Rann na Feirste in Co. Donegal, and while in Dublin they formed a band, Skara Brae who would go on to have a great effect on Irish traditional music.

Dáithí is well known as a guitarist and was one of the first guitarists to use the DADGAD guitar tuning for Irish music after the originator Davy Graham. In 1992 he joined Irish supergroup Altan with whom he sings and plays guitar. Of his use of DADGAD tuning, Sproule says, it "just seemed to instantly gel with Irish music. The nature of the tuning meant that you didn't really produce anything that was terribly, drastically, offensively wrong to people. I was always a singer, but when I started playing with instrumentalists in sessions and pubs, I was able to develop a style by just playing along with them quietly and tactfully." He was deemed "a seminal figure in Irish music" by The Rough Guide to Irish Music.

Sproule is also a member of various other bands and has recorded further solo albums; he also teaches DADGAD guitar and traditional songs at the Center for Irish Music in St. Paul, Minnesota.

Discography

Solo albums
 The Crow in the Sun (2007)
 Lost River, Vol. 1 (New Folk, 2011)
 A Heart Made of Glass (1995)

with Altan

Other bands

 Bright and Early (with Paddy O'Brien and Nathan Gourley - 2015 - New Folk Records)
 From Uig to Duluth (with Laura MacKenzie and Andrea Stern - 2014)
 The Pinery (with Laura MacKenzie – 2009 – New Folk Records) 
 Seanchairde (with Tara Bingham and Dermy Diamond – 2008 – New Folk Records)
 Fingal (with Randal Bays and James Keane – 2008 – New Folk Records)
 Snug in the Blanket (with Jamie Gans and Paddy O'Brien – 2004)
 Overland (with Randal Bays – 2004)
 Trian II (with Liz Carroll and Billy McComiskey – 1995)
 A Thousand Farewells (with Martin and Christine Dowling – 1995)
 Trian (with Liz Carroll and Billy McComiskey – 1992)
 Stranger at the Gate (with Paddy O'Brien – 1988)
 The Iron Man (with Tommy Peoples – 1984)
 Carousel (with Seamus and Manus McGuire – 1984)
 Spring in the Air (with James Kelly and Paddy O'Brien – 1981)
 Is it Yourself?  (with James Kelly and Paddy O'Brien – 1979)
 Skara Brae (Skara Brae – 1971)

Guest appearances
 Four & Eight String Favorites (Bone Tone Records) 2021 - Eric Mohring & Friends
 Merrijig Creek - Fintan Vallely
 Spinning Yarns (Two Tap Records) 2015 - Norah Rendell
 Heigh Ho, The Green Holly (New Folk Records) 2015 - Laura MacKenzie
 Minnesota Lumberjack Songs (Two Tap Records) 2011 - Brian Miller
 Side by Side (Dawros Music) 2010 - Liz and Yvonne Kane
 40 Acre Notch (New Folk Records) 2008 – the HiBs
 The Essential Chieftains (RCA) 2006 – The Chieftains
 Blue Waltz 2004 – Julee Glaub
 Evidence (New Folk Records) 2003 – Laura MacKenzie
 Over the Water (Heart Productions) 2002 – Ross Sutter
 Little Sparrow (Sugarhill) 2001 – Dolly Parton
 Lost in the Loop (Green Linnet) 2001 – Liz Carroll
 Shine (Swallowtail) 2001 – Katie McMahon
 Persevere 2000 – The Proclaimers
 Water from the Well (RCA) 2000 – The Chieftains
 Tis the Season (Compass) 1997  – Laura MacKenzie
 Irish Women Musicians of America (Shanachie) 1995 – Cherish the Ladies
 Heartsongs (Sony) 1994 – Dolly Parton
 Mamma, Will you Buy Me a Banana? (Heart Productions) 1991 – Ross Sutter
 Blue Mesa (Red House) 1989 – Peter Ostroushko
 Liz Carroll (Green Linnet) 1988 – with Liz Carroll
 Sean O'Driscoll (Shanachie/Meadowlark) 1987 – Sean O'Driscoll
 Capel Street (Capelhouse) 1986 – James Kelly
 The Streets of My Old Neighborhood (Rounder) 1983 – Peter Ostroushko
 Sluz Duz Music (Rounder) 1982 – Peter Ostroushko

Compilations
 A Harvest Home: Center for Irish Music Live Recordings, Vol. 5 2013
 Strings Across the North Shore 2009
 Young Irish Musicians Weekend Live!  2008 – with James Kelly and Paddy O'Brien
 New Folk Records Sampler 2007 (New Folk Records) 2007
 Masters of the Irish Guitar (Shanachie) 2006
 The Independence Suite (Celtic Crossings) 2005 – with Randal Bays
 Simply Folk Sampler 3 (Wisconsin Public Radio) 2005
 Festival International des Arts Traditionnels de Québec (Folklore) 2004 – with Trian
 The Ice Palace – Irish Originals from Minnesota (IMDA) 2001
 The Last Bar – Irish Music from Minnesota (IMDA) 2000
 Alternate Tunings Guitar Collection (String Letter) 2000 – with Trian
 As They Pass Through (Kieran's) 2000
 Best of Thistle and Shamrock, Vol. 1 (Hearts of Space) 1999 – with Altan
 Celtic Colours International Festival – the Second Wave (Stephen McDonald) 1999 – with Altan
 A Winter's Tale (Universal) 1998 – with Altan
 Gaelic Roots (Kells) 1997 – with James Kelly, Paddy O'Brien and Gerry O'Connor
 Celtic Music from Mountain Stage (Blue Plate) 1997 – with Altan
 Hunger No More (Éire Arts) 1997

References

External links
 Official Daithí Sproule website
 Official Altan website
 biography at Altan site

1950 births
Living people
Male singers from Northern Ireland
Folk singers from Northern Ireland
Songwriters from Northern Ireland
Musicians from Derry (city)
Altan (band) members
Green Linnet Records artists
Shanachie Records artists